Citizenville: How to Take the Town Square Digital and Reinvent Government is a 2013 book by then-California Lieutenant Governor Gavin Newsom. It describes how ordinary citizens can use new digital tools to dissolve political gridlock and transform American democracy.

References

External links
 Citizenville, Gavin Newsom's Book, Released With Coming-Out Party Hosted By Gettys

Books about politics of the United States
Collaborative non-fiction books
2013 non-fiction books
Gavin Newsom